Coachman Insurance Company is a Canadian insurance company founded in 1979 and based in Ontario. Coachman was purchased in 2001 by SGI Canada Insurance Services, which is a subsidiary of Saskatchewan Government Insurance.

Coachman provides "non-standard" market for automobile insurance, such as drivers with multiple accidents or traffic convictions. Standard automobile, personal property, and commercial property insurance in Ontario are offered under the SGI Canada brand.

References

External links

Government-owned insurance companies of Canada
Financial services companies established in 1979
1979 establishments in Ontario
Companies based in Toronto